Kim Myung-hwi (born 8 May 1981) is a retired Japanese footballer. He is of Korean heritage. he is current assistant manager J2 League club of Machida Zelvia.

Club statistics

Managerial statistics
Update; end of 2018 season

References

External links

1981 births
Living people
Association football people from Hyōgo Prefecture
Japanese footballers
North Korean footballers
J1 League players
J2 League players
Japan Football League players
K League 1 players
JEF United Chiba players
Ventforet Kofu players
Sagawa Shiga FC players
Kataller Toyama players
Sagan Tosu players
Seongnam FC players
Zainichi Korean people
Association football defenders
J1 League managers
Sagan Tosu managers
Japanese football managers